P. C. Gopalan (January 5, 1926 – April 24, 1974), popularly known by his pseudonym, Nandanar was an Indian writer of Malayalam literature. He was known for his novels and short stories which had the backdrop of the Indian Army barracks of the 1940s and 1950s as well as for his children's literature. Anubhavangal, Ira, Thokkukalkkidayile Jeevitham, Athmavinte Novukal, Ariyappedatha Manushyajeevikal, Anubhoothikalude Lokam and a series of stories with Unnikkuttan as the lead character are some of his better known works. He received the Kerala Sahitya Akademi Award for Novel in 1964 for his work, Athmavinte Novukal.

Biography

P. C. Gopalan was born on January 5, 1926, in a poor family at Angadippuram, a village near Perinthalmanna in the present-day Malappuram district in the south Indian state of Kerala to Parameshwaran Tharakan and Nanikkutty Amma. His early schooling was at a local elementary school but due to poverty, he had to abandon his studies after 5th standard. He joined the Indian Army in 1942 where he served until his superannuation in 1964 after which he worked for three years as the National Cadet Corps inspector in Mysore. Returning to Kerala, he joined Fertilisers and Chemicals Travancore in 1967 as their Public Relations Officer.

Nandanar was married to Pandathuveettil Radha and the couple had a son, Sudakaran. He committed suicide on April 24, 1974, at the age of 48, at Commons Lodge, a lodging facility he used to stay at whenever he visited Palakkad, by consuming an overdose of sleeping pills.

Legacy 
Nandanr took his pseudonym after Nandanar, one of the 63 Nayanars in Shaivism. Considered among the major writers of his generation, Nandanar wrote six novels, eleven short story anthologies and Unnikkuttante Lokam, a book for children which comprises three parts viz. Unnikkuttante Oru Divasam, Unnikkuttan Schoolil and Unnikkuttan Valarunnu. His novels and short stories depict the nostalgic sentiments of army men who leave their families back home as well as lives in the villages of Kerala and the longing of youth of his time in matters of love. Besides works like Aathmavinte Novukal, Anubhavangal , Manjakettidam  and Ariyappedatha Manushyajeevikal, he also published an autobiographical work, Anubhavangal details the penury of the writer's childhood. as well as two plays, Prashnam Avasaanikkunnilla and Hsuan Tsang. He received the Kerala Sahitya Akademi Award for Novel in 1964, his novel, Aathmavinte Novukal, earning him the award.

 In popular media 
Atayalangal, the 2008 biopic which received four awards including the Best Director Award for M. G. Sasi at the 39th Kerala State Film Awards of 2008 is based on Anubhavangal, Nandanar's biographical novel. The name of the film was changed from Anubhavangal''.

Bibliography

Novels

Short stories

Children's literature

Translations into other languages

References

External links 
 
 

1926 births
1974 suicides
Malayalam-language writers
Malayalam novelists
Recipients of the Sahitya Akademi Award in Malayalam
Malayalam short story writers
20th-century Indian novelists
20th-century Indian short story writers
Indian male short story writers
Indian male novelists
People from Malappuram district
Novelists from Kerala
20th-century Indian male writers
20th-century Indian dramatists and playwrights
Drug-related suicides in India